The Warm Up is the second official mixtape from Fayetteville, North Carolina rapper J. Cole. It was released on June 15, 2009. J. Cole produced the majority of the mixtape with help from Elite, and Syience. The mixtape has been viewed over 3,100,000 times, streamed over 451,000 times, and downloaded over 700,000 times on DatPiff. The mixtape went Double Platinum on DatPiff.

Background
In November, the single "Lights Please" was released. It was met with great critical acclaim, and caught the attention of rap mogul JAY Z. In December 2008, J. Cole dropped the mixtape "The Warm Up To The Warm Up". This mixtape was released as promotion for "The Warm Up". It included many songs that would make the final cut such as “Grown Simba”, “Dollar And A Dream II”, "'Til Infinity" and the original version of “In The Morning” - a song that would later be remixed and included on Friday Night Lights. Then, in January 2009, Cole released the promotional single "I Got It".

Reception 
J. Cole was famously signed to Roc Nation after Jay-Z heard the track "Lights Please" prior to the release of the mixtape.  In August 2010 J. Cole, was awarded the UMA Male Artist of the Year thanks to his heralded The Warm Up mixtape. He was awarded the first ever Sucker Free Summit Who's Got Next in 2010 because of the mixtape. On June 26, 2013 J. Cole announced that he would be re-releasing The Warm Up and Friday Night Lights for retail sale, in order to give them the push they deserved.

In his review for MSN Music, music critic Robert Christgau gave the mixtape a two-star honorable mention, indicating a "likable effort consumers attuned to its overriding aesthetic or individual vision may well enjoy." He cited "World Is Empty" and "Get Away" as highlights and quipped, "He's so talented you can hear how much he wants it, so talented you wince every time he shoots himself in the foot, e.g. 'Put some chains on my niggaz like I own slaves'".

Track listing

Sample credits
 "Grown Simba" samples "Overture: A Partial History of Black Music" by Mervyn Warren
 "Just To Get By" samples "Get By" by Talib Kweli
 "Dead Presidents II" samples "Dead Presidents" by Jay-Z
 "World Is Empty" samples "My World Is Empty Without You" by Lee Fields & The Expressions
 "Dreams" samples "Wildflower" by Hank Crawford
 "Royal Flush" samples "Royal Flush" by Big Boi (which samples "Voyage to Atlantis" by The Isley Brothers)
 "Water Break" samples "I Shot Ya" by LL Cool J and "Warning" by The Notorious B.I.G.
 "Heartache" samples *"Born to Live with Heartache" by Mary Love
 "Get Away" samples "Cross My Heart" by Billy Stewart
 "Knock Knock" samples "Knock Knock" by Monica and Kanye West
 "Ladies" samples "Ladies" by Lee Fields & The Expressions
 "Til' Infinity" samples "'93 'Til Infinity" by Souls of Mischief
 "The Badness" samples "Sunset Drive" by Husky Rescue
 "Last Call" samples "Last Call" by Kanye West
 "Losing My Balance" samples "Balance" by Sara Tavares

References

External links
J. Cole
J. Cole - The Warm Up Mixtape

2009 mixtape albums
J. Cole albums
Albums produced by J. Cole
Dreamville Records albums